The tiger shark (Galeocerdo cuvier) is the last extant member of the family Galeocerdonidae. Populations are found in many tropical and temperate waters, especially around central Pacific islands. Its name derives from the dark stripes down its body, which resemble a tiger's pattern, but fade as the shark matures.

The tiger shark is a solitary, mostly nocturnal hunter. It is notable for having the widest food spectrum of all sharks, with a range of prey that includes crustaceans, fish, seals, birds, squid, turtles, sea snakes, dolphins, and even other, smaller sharks. It also has a reputation as a "garbage eater", consuming a variety of inedible, man-made objects that linger in its stomach. Though usually considered apex predators, tiger sharks are sometimes taken as prey by groups of killer whales.  It is considered a near threatened species because of finning and fishing by humans.

The tiger shark is second only to the great white in recorded fatal attacks on humans, but these events are still exceedingly rare.

Taxonomy
The shark was first described by Peron and Lesueur in 1822, and was given the name Squalus cuvier. Müller and Henle in 1837 renamed it Galeocerdo tigrinus. The genus, Galeocerdo, is derived from the Greek galeos, which means shark, and kerdo, the word for fox. It is often colloquially called the man-eater shark.

The tiger shark is a member of the order Carcharhiniformes, the most species-rich order of sharks, with more than 270 species also including the small catsharks and hammerhead sharks. Members of this order are characterized by the presence of a nictitating membrane over the eyes, two dorsal fins, an anal fin, and five gill slits. It is the largest member of the order, commonly referred to as ground sharks. It is also the last extant member of Galeocerdonidae.

Description
It is dimorphic, with females being the larger sex. Mature females are often over  while mature males rarely get that large. Weights of particularly large female tiger sharks can exceed . Even larger unconfirmed catches have been claimed. Some papers have accepted a record of an exceptional  length for a tiger shark, but since this is far larger than any scientifically observed specimen, verification would be needed. A 2019 study suggested that Pliocene tiger sharks could have reached  in maximum length.

Among the largest extant sharks, the tiger shark ranks in average size only behind the whale shark (Rhincodon typus), the basking shark (Cetorhinus maximus), and the great white shark (Carcharodon carcharias). This makes it the second-largest predatory shark, after the great white. Some other species such as megamouth sharks (Megachasma pelagios), Pacific sleeper sharks (Somniosus pacificus), Greenland sharks (Somniosus microcephalus), and bluntnose sixgill sharks (Hexanchus griseus) broadly overlap in size with the tiger shark, but as these species are comparatively poorly studied,  whether their typical mature size matches that of the tiger shark is unclear.

Tiger shark teeth are unique with very sharp, pronounced serrations and an unmistakable sideways-pointing tip. Such dentition has developed to slice through flesh, bone, and other tough substances such as turtle shells. Like most sharks, its teeth are continually replaced by rows of new teeth throughout the shark's life. Relative to the shark's size, tiger shark teeth are considerably shorter than those of a great white shark, but they are nearly as broad as the root as the great white's teeth and are arguably better suited to slicing through hard-surfaced prey.

A tiger shark generally has long fins to provide lift as the shark maneuvers through water, while the long upper tail provides bursts of speed. The tiger shark normally swims using small body movements.

Skin
The skin of a tiger shark can typically range from blue to light green with a white or light-yellow underbelly. The advantage of this is that when it is hunting for its prey, when prey looks at the shark from above, the shark will be camouflaged, since the water below is darker. When prey is below the shark and looks up the light underbelly will also camouflage the shark with the sunlight. This is known as countershading. Dark spots and stripes are most visible in young sharks and fade as the shark matures. Its head is somewhat wedge-shaped, which makes it easy to turn quickly to one side. They have small pits on the snout which hold electroreceptors called the ampullae of Lorenzini, which enable them to detect electric fields, including the weak electrical impulses generated by prey, which helps them to hunt. Tiger sharks also have a sensory organ called a lateral line which extends on their flanks down most of the length of their sides. The primary role of this structure is to detect minute vibrations in the water. These adaptations allow the tiger shark to hunt in darkness and detect hidden prey.

Vision
Sharks do not have moveable upper or lower eyelids, but the tiger shark—among other sharks—has a nictitating membrane, a clear eyelid that can cover the eye. A reflective layer behind the tiger shark's retina, called the tapetum lucidum, allows light-sensing cells a second chance to capture photons of visible light. This enhances vision in low-light conditions.

Distribution and habitat

The tiger shark is often found close to the coast, mainly in tropical and subtropical waters throughout the world. Its behavior is primarily nomadic, but is guided by warmer currents, and it stays closer to the equator throughout the colder months. It tends to stay in deep waters that line reefs, but it does move into channels to pursue prey in shallower waters. In the western Pacific Ocean, the shark has been found as far north as Japan and as far south as New Zealand. It has also been recorded in the Mediterranean Sea, but rarely, off Malaga (Spain), Sicily (Italy) and Libya. 

Tiger sharks can be seen in the Gulf of Mexico, North American beaches, and parts of South America. It is also commonly observed in the Caribbean Sea. Other locations where tiger sharks are seen include off Africa, China, India, Australia, and Indonesia.

Feeding
The tiger shark is an apex predator and has a reputation for eating almost anything. These predators swim close inland to eat at night, and during the day swim out into deeper waters. Young tiger sharks are found to feed largely on small fish, as well as various small jellyfish, and mollusks including cephalopods. Around the time they attain , or near sexual maturity, their selection expands considerably, and much larger animals become regular prey. Numerous fish, crustaceans, sea birds, sea snakes, marine mammals (e.g. bottlenose dolphins (Tursiops), common dolphins (Delphinus), spotted dolphins (Stenella), dugongs (Dugong dugon), seals and sea lions, and sea turtles (including the three largest species: the leatherback (Dermochelys coriacea), the loggerhead (Caretta caretta) and the green sea turtles (Chelonia mydas),) are regularly eaten by adult tiger sharks. In fact, adult sea turtles have been found in up to 20.8% of studied tiger shark stomachs, indicating somewhat of a dietary preference for sea turtles where they are commonly encountered. They also eat other sharks (including adult sandbar sharks (Carcharhinus plumbeus)), as well as rays, and sometimes even other tiger sharks.

Due to high risk of predation, dolphins often avoid regions inhabited by tiger sharks. Injured or ailing whales may also be attacked and eaten. A group was documented killing an ailing humpback whale (Megaptera novaeangliae) in 2006 near Hawaii. A scavenger, the tiger shark will feed on dead whales, and has been documented doing so alongside great white sharks.

Evidence of dugong predation was identified in one study that found dugong tissue in 15 of 85 tiger sharks caught off the Australian coast. Additionally, examination of adult dugongs has shown scars from failed shark attacks. To minimize attacks, dugong microhabitats shift similarly to those of known tiger shark prey when the sharks are abundant.

The broad, heavily calcified jaws and nearly terminal mouth, combined with robust, serrated teeth, enable the tiger shark to take on these large prey. In addition, excellent eyesight and acute sense of smell enable it to react to faint traces of blood and follow them to the source. The ability to pick up low-frequency pressure waves enables the shark to advance towards an animal with confidence, even in murky water. The shark circles its prey and studies it by prodding it with its snout. When attacking, the shark often eats its prey whole, although larger prey are often eaten in gradual large bites and finished over time.

Notably, terrestrial mammals, including horses (Equus ferus caballus), goats (Capra aegagrus hircus), sheep (Ovis aries), dogs (Canis lupus familiaris), cats (Felis catus), and brown rats (Rattus norvegicus), are fairly common in the stomach contents of tiger sharks around the coasts of Hawaii. In one case, remains of two flying foxes were found in the stomach of this shark. Because of its aggressive and indiscriminate feeding style, it often mistakenly eats inedible objects, such as automobile license plates, oil cans, tires, and baseballs.

Predation by killer whales
Although tiger sharks are apex predators, they are sometimes preyed on by pods of killer whales. A pod's method of hunting a tiger shark is to drive it to the surface. A killer whale will then grab the shark mid-body and hold it upside down to induce tonic immobility and drown the shark. The killer whales bite off the shark's fins before disemboweling and devouring it midwater.

Swimming efficiency and stealth
All tiger sharks generally swim slowly, which, combined with cryptic coloration, may make them difficult for prey to detect in some habitats. They are especially well camouflaged against dark backgrounds. Despite their sluggish appearance, tiger sharks are one of the strongest swimmers of the carcharhinid sharks. Once the shark has come close, a speed burst allows it to reach the intended prey before it can escape.

Reproduction
Females mate once every three years. They breed by internal fertilization. The male inserts one of his claspers into the female's genital opening (cloaca), acting as a guide for the sperm. The male uses his teeth to hold the female still during the procedure, often causing the female considerable discomfort. Mating in the Northern Hemisphere generally takes place between March and May, with birth between April and June the following year. In the Southern Hemisphere, mating takes place in November, December, or early January. The tiger shark is the only species in its family that is ovoviviparous; its eggs hatch internally and the young are born live when fully developed.
Tiger Sharks are unique among all sharks in the fact that they employ embrytrophy to nourish their young inside the womb. The young gestate in sacks which are filled with a fluid that nourishes them. This allows for the young to dramatically increase in size, even though they have no placental connection to the mother.

The young develop inside the mother's body up to 16 months. Litters range from 10 to 80 pups. How long tiger sharks live is unknown, but they can live longer than 12 years.

Ontogeny 
Tiger shark ontogeny has been little studied until recently, but studies by Hammerschlag et al., indicated that as they grow, their tails become more symmetrical with age. Additionally, while the heads on juvenile tiger sharks are more conical and similar to other requiem sharks, adult tiger sharks have a head which is relatively broader. The reason for the larger caudal fin on juvenile tiger sharks is theorized to be an adaptation to escape predation by larger predators and to catch quicker-moving prey. As tiger sharks mature, their head also becomes much wider and their tails no longer become as large in proportion to their body size as when they are juveniles because they do not face elevated levels of predation risk upon maturity. The results of this study were interpreted as reflecting two ecological transitions: as tiger sharks mature they become more migratory and having a symmetrical tail is more advantageous in long-distance traveling, and that tiger sharks consume more diverse prey items with age, which requires a greater bite force and broader head.

Conservation

The tiger shark is captured and killed for its fins, flesh, and liver. It is caught regularly in target and nontarget fisheries. Several populations have declined where they have been heavily fished. Continued demand for fins may result in further declines. They are considered a near threatened species due to excessive finning and fishing by humans according to International Union for Conservation of Nature. In June 2018 the New Zealand Department of Conservation classified the tiger shark as "Migrant" with the qualifier "Secure Overseas" under the New Zealand Threat Classification System.

While shark fin has very few nutrients, shark liver has a high concentration of vitamin A, which is used in the production of vitamin oils. In addition, the tiger shark is captured and killed for its distinct skin, as well as by big-game fishers.

In 2010, Greenpeace International added the tiger shark to its seafood red list, which is a list of commonly sold fish likely to come from unsustainable fisheries.

Relationship with humans
Although sharks rarely bite humans, the tiger shark is reported to be responsible for a large share of fatal shark-bite incidents, and is regarded as one of the most dangerous shark species. They often visit shallow reefs, harbors, and canals, creating the potential for encounter with humans. The tiger shark also dwells in river mouths and other runoff-rich water. While it ranks second on the list of number of recorded shark attacks on humans, behind only the great white shark, such attacks are few and very seldom fatal. Typically, three to four shark bites occur per year in Hawaii; one notable survivor of such an attack is surfing champion Bethany Hamilton, who lost her left arm at age 13 to a tiger shark in 2003. This bite rate is very low, considering that thousands of people swim, surf, and dive in Hawaiian waters every day. Human interactions with tiger sharks in Hawaiian waters have been shown to increase between September and November, when tiger shark females are believed to migrate to the islands to give birth.

Between 1959 and 2000, 4,668 tiger sharks were culled in an effort to protect the tourism industry. Despite damaging the shark population, these efforts were shown to be ineffective in decreasing the number of interactions between humans and tiger sharks. Feeding sharks in Hawaii (except for traditional Hawaiian cultural or religious practices) is illegal, and interaction with them, such as cage diving, is discouraged. South African shark behaviorist and shark diver Mark Addison demonstrated divers could interact and dive with them outside of a shark cage in a 2007 Discovery Channel special, and underwater photographer Fiona Ayerst swam with them in the Bahamas. At "Tiger Beach" off Grand Bahama, uncaged diving with – and even the handling of – female tiger sharks has become a routine occurrence.

Mythology
Tiger sharks are considered to be sacred aumākua (ancestor spirits) by some native Hawaiians.

See also

 List of sharks
 List of prehistoric cartilaginous fish genera

References

External links

 
 General information Enchanted Learning. Retrieved January 22, 2005.
 "Different diet information" Shark Info. Retrieved January 22, 2005.
 "Tiger sharks in Hawaii" Research program. Retrieved January 22, 2005.
 "Tiger shark: Fact File" from National Geographic
 Tracking research on tiger sharks
 Pictures of tiger sharks
 
 Diver Has Been Friends With Tiger Shark For 20 Years!

tiger shark
Pantropical fish
Extant Ypresian first appearances
Ovoviviparous fish
Near threatened fauna of North America
tiger shark
tiger shark
tiger shark
Articles containing video clips
Apex predators